The Zugdidi uezd was a county (uezd) of the Kutaisi Governorate of the Caucasus Viceroyalty of the Russian Empire. It bordered the Sukhumi Okrug to the north, the Lechkhumi uezd to the east, the Senaki uezd to the south, and the Black Sea to the west. The area of the Zugdidi uezd corresponded to most of the contemporary Samegrelo-Zemo Svaneti region of Georgia. The county was eponymously named for its administrative center, Zugdidi.

History 
The Zugdidi uezd was formed in 1867 as part of the Kutaisi Governorate on the territory during the time of the Russian Empire. In 1918, the Kutaisi Governorate including the Zugdidi uezd was incorporated into the Democratic Republic of Georgia.

Administrative divisions 
The subcounties (uchastoks) of the Zugdidi uezd in 1913 were as follows:

Demographics

Russian Empire Census 
The majority of the population indicated Mingrelian to be their mother tongue, with a significant Georgian speaking minority.

Kavkazskiy kalendar 

Notes

References

Bibliography 

1840s establishments in Georgia (country)
1846 establishments in the Russian Empire
Caucasus Viceroyalty (1801–1917)
1910s disestablishments in Georgia (country)
Kutaisi Governorate
Modern history of Georgia (country)
States and territories established in 1846
States and territories disestablished in 1918
Uezds of Kutaisi Governorate